BIAD may refer to:

 Blind insertion airway device, a medical device for securing the patients airway
 Birmingham Institute of Art and Design, a British university art and design teaching and research centre